Robert John Burke (born September 12, 1960) is an American actor known for his roles in the early films of Hal Hartley as well as his roles in RoboCop 3 (1993), Tombstone (1993), and Thinner (1996). During the 2000s Burke became well known for his portrayal of Mickey Gavin on Rescue Me (2004–11), Bart Bass in Gossip Girl (2007–12), Ed Tucker in Law and Order: Special Victims Unit (2002–20), and a number of other film and television roles including Intrusion (2021).

Early life and education
Burke was born in Washington Heights, Manhattan, the son of immigrants from Galway, Ireland. He graduated from Northport High School and attended the Acting Conservatory at State University of New York at Purchase.

Career
Burke's television roles include Mickey Gavin on Rescue Me, Bart Bass on Gossip Girl, Kidnapped, Six Degrees, Law & Order and IAB Captain Ed Tucker on Law & Order: Special Victims Unit, Officer Patrick Simmons on Person of Interest, Sex and the City, and The Sopranos.

Burke's film work began as a regular performer in fellow Purchase alumnus Hal Hartley's indie films, such as 1989's The Unbelievable Truth. Burke appeared opposite Laura Dern's Academy Award nominated performance in the 1991 feature Rambling Rose. He returned to work with Hartley again in 1992 in the  Cannes Film Festival, Palme d'Or nominated Simple Men. He also appeared in Hartley's 1995 film Flirt. Burke took over the lead from Peter Weller in RoboCop 3. He starred in Richard Stanley's 1993 film Dust Devil, and in 2001's No Such Thing. In 1996, he played the lead role in the film adaptation of Stephen King's Thinner. In 2004, Burke played the role of Mr. Neck in the independent film Speak. In 2005, Burke had a role in Hide and Seek, a psychological thriller. He had roles in the Academy Award-nominated films Munich directed by Steven Spielberg and Good Night, and Good Luck, directed by George Clooney. In 2008, he portrayed James Mattis, Commanding General of 1st Marine Division in the HBO miniseries Generation Kill. Burke also portrayed General Ned Almond, commanding general of the 92nd Division, Buffalo Soldiers, in the 2008 Spike Lee film Miracle at St. Anna. He appeared in the 2012 film Safe. He played the Colorado Springs chief of police in Spike Lee's BlacKkKlansman (2018).

In 2015 and 2017, he appeared in three episodes of Last Week Tonight with John Oliver, once parodying his role on Law & Order.
Burke is seen opposite Frieda Pinto in the Netflix thriller "Intrusion". In 2022, he portrayed a CIA agent Smitty in Black Panther: Wakanda Forever. He will next appear alongside Keira Knightly in a remake of the crime drama The Boston Strangler.

Personal life
Burke holds a second degree black belt in Matsubayashi, Shorin-ryu Okinawa karate. He is a certified and active New York State firefighter, currently captain of an engine. Burke is also active with foundation work including VETHACK, Leary Firefighter Foundation (LFF), FDNY Foundation, FDNY Fire Family Transport Foundation, Lt. Joseph DiBernardo Foundation for Fire Fighter Survival.

Filmography

Film

Television

References

External links
 
 Robert John Burke at Twitter

1960 births
Living people
Male actors from New York City
American male film actors
American people of Irish descent
American male television actors
American male voice actors
American firefighters
State University of New York at Purchase alumni
People from Washington Heights, Manhattan
20th-century American male actors
21st-century American male actors
Shōrin-ryū practitioners